"Triangle Walks" is the third single from Swedish recording artist Fever Ray's self-titled debut album, Fever Ray (2009).

Music video
The music video was directed by Mikel Cee Karlsson. In the video, Fever Ray is seen standing in a room in face paint as watery shadows and darkness envelop them.

Track listings
iTunes single
"Triangle Walks" – 4:22
"Triangle Walks" (Ben Hoo's Sill Frame) – 4:27
"Triangle Walks" (Spektre Vocal Mix) – 8:11
"Triangle Walks" (Tora Vinter Remix) – 5:18
"Triangle Walks" (Allez Allez Remix) – 6:09
"Triangle Walks" (Tiga's 1-2-3-4 Remix) – 5:17
"Triangle Walks" (James Rutledge Remix) – 4:18
"Triangle Walks" (Tiga's 1-2-3-4 Remix Instrumental) – 5:19

Swedish and UK 12" single
A1. "Triangle Walks" (Rex the Dog Remix) – 6:36
B1. "Triangle Walks" (James Rutledge Remix) – 4:29
B2. "Triangle Walks" (Tora Vinter Remix) – 5:21

UK promo CD single
"Triangle Walks" (Radio Edit)
"Triangle Walks" (James Rutledge Remix)
"Triangle Walks" (Tiga's Radio Edit)

UK promo CD single (Remixes)
"Triangle Walks" (Tiga's 1-2-3-4 Remix) – 5:19
"Triangle Walks" (Tiga's 1-2-3-4 Instrumental) – 5:19
"Triangle Walks" (Spectre Dub) – 6:43
"Triangle Walks" (Spectre Remix) – 8:14
"Triangle Walks" (Allez Allez Remix) – 6:12
"Triangle Walks" (James Rutledge Remix) – 4:19
"Triangle Walks" (Tora Vinter Remix) – 5:19
"Triangle Walks" (Rex the Dog Remix) – 6:39

European promo CD single (Rex the Dog Edit)
"Triangle Walks" (Rex the Dog Remix) – 6:36
"Triangle Walks" (Rex the Dog Remix - Radio Edit) – 3:15

Charts

References

2009 singles
2009 songs
Fever Ray songs
Songs written by Karin Dreijer